Conjuration: Fat Tuesday's Session is a live album by baritone saxophonist Pepper Adams featuring trumpeter Kenny Wheeler which was recorded in August 1983 and originally released on the Uptown label in 1984 as Live at Fat Tuesdays then released on CD with additional tracks on Reservoir Records in 1990.

Reception 

According to The Penguin Guide to Jazz, Conjuration is: "A heartening farewell to Adams career on record" noting "this live set emphasises his virtues – the muscularity of sound, oversized tone and plangent phrasing – so decisively that one overlooks any scent of routine in his playing". The AllMusic review states "The great baritonist Pepper Adams is teamed up with the adventurous trumpeter Kenny Wheeler and veteran pianist Hank Jones for this live quintet date. Wheeler, although often associated with the avant-garde, has never had any difficulty playing changes and his strong style clearly inspired Adams".

Track listing 
All compositions by Pepper Adams, except where indicated.
 "Conjuration" – 7:47
 "Alone Together" (Arthur Schwartz, Howard Dietz) – 8:17
 "Diabolique II" – 7:58
 "Claudette's Way" – 7:35 Bonus track on CD release
 "Dylan's Delight" – 6:46 Bonus track on CD release
 "Dr. Deep" – 7:33
 "Old Ballad" – (Kenny Wheeler) 7:10
 "Quittin' Time" (Thad Jones) – 6:52 Bonus track on CD release
 "Dobbin" – 5:45
 "Tis" (Jones) – 2:34

Personnel 
Pepper Adams – baritone saxophone
Kenny Wheeler – trumpet, flugelhorn
Hank Jones – piano
Clint Houston – bass
Louis Hayes – drums

References 

1984 live albums
Pepper Adams live albums
Reservoir Records live albums
Uptown Records (jazz) live albums